Askomandoura is a type of bagpipe played as a traditional instrument on the Greek island of Crete, similar to the tsampouna.

Its use in Crete is attested in illustrations from the mid-15th Century.

With respect to the way of the production sound, it is categorized as an aerophone musical instrument.

See also
Mandoura
Greek musical instruments
Cretan music
Cretan lyra
Greek music

References

External links
Photo
Photo

Bagpipes
Cretan music
Greek music
Greek musical instruments